The Shire of Kingaroy was a local government area in the South Burnett region of Queensland, Australia, about  northwest of the capital, Brisbane.

The shire's name derives from the Wakka Wakka Aboriginal words "king dhu'roi", meaning "ant hungry". While land use was dominantly pastoral in the area's early European history, dairying, beef, small crops and in particular peanut farming became mainstays of Kingaroy's economy.

History
Kingaroy was originally part of the Barambah (later Nanango) Divisional Board, which was created on 11 November 1879 under the Divisional Boards Act 1879. With the passage of the Local Authorities Act 1902, Nanango became a shire council on 31 March 1903.

The town of Kingaroy started to grow after the arrival of the railway in 1904, and on 12 January 1912, the Shire of Kingaroy was proclaimed.

On 15 March 2008, under the Local Government (Reform Implementation) Act 2007 passed by the Parliament of Queensland on 10 August 2007, the Shire of Kingaroy merged with the Shires of Murgon, Nanango and Wondai to form the South Burnett Regional Council.

Towns and localities
The Shire of Kingaroy included the following settlements:

 Kingaroy
 Coolabunia
 Goodger
 Inverlaw
 Kumbia
 Memerambi
 Taabinga
 Wooroolin

Chairmen
 1927: R. S. Brown 

Other notable members of the Kingaroy Council include:
 1946—1949: Joh Bjelke-Petersen, Premier of Queensland
 1976-1990: Warren Truss, Deputy Prime Minister of Australia

Population

References

 
Kingaroy
Kingaroy
2008 disestablishments in Australia
Populated places disestablished in 2008